Depot Creek may refer to:

Canada
British Columbia
Depot Creek (BC-Washington)
Ontario
Depot Creek (Napanee River), in Frontenac County and Lennox and Addington County
Nipissing District
Depot Creek (Barron River)
Depot Creek (Lake Nosbonsing)
Depot Creek (Sudbury District)
Depot Creek (Thunder Bay District)
United States
Depot Creek (BC-Washington)